The 2021 Valletta Cup was a Twenty20 International (T20I) cricket tournament held in Malta between 21 and 24 October 2021. It was the second edition of the Valletta Cup. The matches were played at the Marsa Sports Club in Marsa. The participating teams were the hosts Malta along with Bulgaria, Gibraltar and Switzerland.

This was the first international tournament for Switzerland since the introduction of global T20I status in January 2019, and their re-admittance to the International Cricket Council (ICC) in July 2021. Cricket Switzerland (previously known as the Swiss Cricket Association), had been suspended by the ICC in 2012 due to non-compliance following the formation of a second organization also claiming to oversee cricket in the country. They were one of three nations to gain Associate membership after the ICC's annual general meeting in July 2021.

Switzerland finished on top of the round-robin stage with three wins. Malta defeated Switzerland in the final, after Bulgaria defeated Gibraltar in the third-place playoff. After the tournament, Malta and Gibraltar played a rain-affected two-match bilateral T20I series that was shared after one game was lost to the weather and the other finished as a DLS method tie.

Squads

Valletta Cup

Points table

Fixtures

Third-place play-off

Final

Bilateral series

1st T20I

2nd T20I

References

External links
 Series home at ESPN Cricinfo (Valletta Cup)
 Series home at ESPN Cricinfo (Gibraltar in Malta)

Associate international cricket competitions in 2021–22
Valletta Cup